Wu Wang may refer to:

Chinese royalty
Wu Wang (武王 or 吴王/吳王), may be translated as Prince Wu, King Wu, Prince of Wu, or King of Wu, depending on context:

Zhou dynasty
King Wu of Zhou (died 1043 BC), first king of the Zhou dynasty
King Wu of Chu (died 690 BC), first king of the state of Chu
Kings of Wu (state):
Shoumeng (died 561 BC)
Liao of Wu (died 515 BC)
Helü (died 496 BC)
Fuchai (died 473 BC)
King Wu of Qin (329–307BC), king of the state of Qin
King Wuling of Zhao (died 295BC), also known as King Wu of Zhao

Nanyue, Han dynasty, and Three Kingdoms
Zhao Tuo (died 137BC), King Wu of Nanyue from 204BC to 196BC
Liu Pi, Prince of Wu (216–154 BC), prince of the Han dynasty
Cao Cao (155–220), created Prince Wu of Wei by the Han dynasty
Sun Quan (182–252), created Prince of Wu by Cao Wei

Jin dynasty, Sixteen Kingdoms, and Northern and Southern Dynasties
Zhang Gui (255–314), posthumously honored by the Former Liang as King of Wu
Emperor Kang of Jin (322–344), known as Prince of Wu from 326 to 327
Murong Chui (326–396), founding emperor of Later Yan, known as Prince of Wu from 354 to 370 (during the Former Yan)
Tufa Wugu (died 399), Prince or King Wu of Wuwei, founding ruler of Southern Liang
Tuoba Yu (died 452), Northern Wei emperor, known as Prince of Wu from 442 to 452

Tang dynasty, Balhae and the Five Dynasties
Du Fuwei (598–624), warlord, known as Prince of Wu after 620 when he submitted to the Tang
Li Ke (died 653), Tang dynasty prince, known as Prince of Wu after 636
Mu of Balhae (died 737), also known as Wu of Bohai, ruler of Balhae (Bohai)
Rulers (either Prince or King) of Yang Wu:
Yang Xingmi (852–905)
Yang Wo (886–908)
Yang Longyan (897–920)
Yang Pu (900–938)
Rulers of Wuyue:
Qian Liu (852–932), known as Prince of Wu from 903 to 907 (during the Tang dynasty)
Qian Yuanguan (887–941), known as Prince of Wu from 933 to 934 (during the Later Tang dynasty)

Song dynasty
Li Yu (Southern Tang)
Zhao Dezhao
Zhao Yuanyan

Yuan, Ming, and Qing dynasties
Zhu Yuanzhang
Zhang Shicheng
Koxinga

See also
Wang Wu (disambiguation)